Viggo Dorph-Petersen (9 February 1851 in Copenhagen – 23 July 1937 in Perpignan, France) was a Danish architect He is best known for designing French chateaus including Château d'Aubiry.

Selected works

  (1888)
 Château d'Aubiry (1893)

References

Danish architects
1851 births
1937 deaths